Clara Novello Davies (7 April 1861 – 7 February 1943) was a Welsh singer, teacher and conductor. She used the pen name Pencerddes Morgannwg.

Early life
Clara Novello Davies was born in Cardiff to Jacob Davies, a miner, and Margaret (née Evans) Davies. She was named after Clara Novello, a famous soprano (1818–1908). Her father, leader of the church choir, taught her to play the harmonium. She also studied music with Charles Williams of the Llandaff Cathedral.

Career 
Davies was accompanist for the Cardiff United Choir and Cardiff Blue Ribbon Choir, as a young woman. In 1883, she founded and conducted the Royal Welsh Ladies' Choir. 

In 1893 two of her students, May John and Elsie Drinkwater won a prize at the National Eisteddfod in Pontypridd singing 'Quis est homo?' from Rossini's Stabat Mater. This led to an invitation for her choir to attend the World's Columbian Exposition in Chicago that year. At the Exposition May John took the prize for best soprano. The choir also sang at the Paris Exposition (1900). 

Davies was still conducting into her seventies when her New York-based Novello Davies Artist Choir was invited to the 1937 Paris Exposition. The choir raised funds for charity during both World Wars.

Clara Novello Davies published an instructional book, You Can Sing (1928), and a memoir, The Life I Have Loved (1940). She also wrote songs, including "Friend!" (1905) and "Mother!" (1911). She was awarded the Médaille de Mérite by the French government, in 1937. Among her voice students were American actress Dorothy Dickson, baritone Louis Graveure, and opera singer Mary Ellis.

Death
Clara Novello Davies married David Davies, a solicitor's clerk with the same surname as her own, on 31 October 1883. Their son, David Ivor Davies, became better known as Ivor Novello, the actor, composer, dramatist and director. Their adopted daughter, who was born Maria Williams but took the name Marie Novello, was a concert pianist who died from throat cancer on 21 June 1928, aged 44. Clara Novello Davies was widowed in 1931, and died in London in 1943, aged 81. She was cremated at Golders Green Crematorium.

The character "Madame Annie" in Rhys Davies' The Painted King (1954) is based on Clara Novello Davies.

References

External links
Gwawr Jones, 'The mighty Mam': Clara Novello Davies a byd cerddoriaeth broffesiynol yng Nghymru, PhD thesis, Bangor University, 2015.
Clara Novello Davies portraits at the National Portrait Gallery (London).

1861 births
1943 deaths
Musicians from Cardiff
Singers from Cardiff
20th-century Welsh women singers
Welsh conductors (music)
Ivor Novello
19th-century Welsh women singers